École polytechnique universitaire de l'université Lyon-I (Polytech Lyon) a French engineering College created in 1992.

The school trains engineers in six majors:

 Computer Science Engineering
 Materials Science and Engineering
 Applied Mathematics and Modeling
 Mechanical Engineering
 Biomedical Engineering
 Industrial systems and Robotics

Located in Lyon, as well as in Roanne, Polytech Lyon is a public higher education institution. The school is a member of the Claude Bernard University Lyon 1.

References

External links
 Polytech Lyon

Engineering universities and colleges in France
Roanne
Polytech Lyon
Lyon
Educational institutions established in 1992
1992 establishments in France